Eleftherios "Lefteris" Petrounias (born 30 November 1990, Athens) is a Greek artistic gymnast. He is the 2016 Olympic champion, 2020 Olympic bronze medalist, three-time World champion (2015, 2017, 2018) and a six-time (2011, 2015–18, 2021, 2022) European medalist on the still rings (six gold and one bronze). He was named the Greek Male Athlete of the Year, for the years 2015, 2016, 2017, and 2018.

Early life and education
Petrounias grew up as a hyperactive child, and at the age of five, his mother brought him to the Panionios Gymnastics Club so that he could release his energy. He later injured his finger and has two screws inserted in it; he also had two hernia surgeries. At the age of 14, he took a three-year break from gymnastics due to physical and emotional fatigue.

Petrounias has a degree in communications and marketing from the Athens University of Economics and Business. Besides gymnastics, he practices parkour. He takes part in anti-bullying campaigns, as he was bullied himself when he was child due to his small size.

Career

2011 European Championships

Petrounias's debut major international medal came when he competed at the 2011 European Artistic Gymnastics Championships in Berlin, at the age of 20. During the Championships, Petrounias won a Bronze Medal on the rings. He scored 15.675 during the final, behind Konstantin Pluzhnikov (15.850) and Aleksandr Balandin (15.775) of Russia

2015 European Championships

In April 2015, Petrounias competed in the 2015 European Artistic Gymnastics Championships in Montpellier, France. He won gold during the rings final during the championships, scoring 15.866 during the final - 0.300 points ahead of tied silver medalists Samir Aït Saïd of France and Denis Ablyazin of Russia

2015 World Championships
In late 2015, Petrounias competed in the 2015 World Artistic Gymnastics Championships in Glasgow.

Petrounias qualified for the Rings Final in 1st position, scoring 15.900.

During the final, Eleftherios won his debut World Title on Rings with a scored 15.800; You Hao was the Silver medalist, followed by Bronze medalist Liu Yang of China.

2016 European Championships
In May 2016, Petrounias attended the 2016 European Men's Artistic Gymnastics Championships in Bern, Switzerland.

He qualified in 1st Position for the Rings Final, scoring 15.700.

During the Finals, he once again secured a gold medal on the rings, scoring 15.866.

Rio Olympics 
Petrounias was the Olympic torch relay originating torchbearer after its ignition at Olympia on 21 April 2016, and he has a further distinction of being the first Greek gymnast selected in modern Olympics torch relay history.

At the 2016 Summer Olympics in Rio de Janeiro, Petrounias qualified for the rings final in second place with a score of 15.833. On 15 August 2016 he won the gold medal in this event with a score of 16.000, 0.234 points higher than the silver medal winner, Arthur Zanetti of Brazil. His medalling in the rings closed a hiatus for Greece after Dimosthenis Tampakos won a Gold medal for Greece in home territory at the 2004 Summer Olympics.

2017 European Championships
In April 2017, Petrounias competed at the 2017 European Artistic Gymnastics Championships at the Polyvalent Hall in Cluj-Napoca, Romania.

During the Competition, Petrounias secured his third European Championship Rings Title, scoring 15.433 during the final - above Silver Medalist Courtney Tulloch of Great Britain, who scored 15.066, and Bronze Medalist Ihor Radivilov of Ukraine, who scored 15.033.

2017 Gymnastics World Championships

In late 2017, Petrounias competed at the 2017 Artistic Gymnastics World Championships in Montreal.

During the Championships, Petrounias successfully defended his World Title on Rings, scoring 15.433 during the final - 0.100 points above Denis Abliazin of Russia, who took the silver medal, and 0.167 points above Liu Yang of China, who took the bronze.

2018 European Championships
Petrounias tied the European record of 4 gold medals in European championships, held by the (now retired) athlete Jury Chechi from Italy. Eleftherios won the gold medal in the European Championships in Glasgow, on 12 August 2018, despite his shoulder injury.

2018 Gymnastics World Championships
At the 2018 Artistic Gymnastics World Championships in Doha, Petrounias successfully defended his title and earned his third world championship gold on Rings with a score of 15.366 in event finals. 2012 Olympic champion on Rings Arthur Zanetti earned the silver and Marco Lodadio earned the bronze.

Personal life
Petrounias has been married to fellow Greek gymnast Vasiliki Millousi since July 2019.  They have two daughters, Sofia and Eleni.

References

External links

 

1990 births
Living people
Greek male artistic gymnasts
Gymnasts at the 2015 European Games
European Games medalists in gymnastics
European Games gold medalists for Greece
World champion gymnasts
European champions in gymnastics
Medalists at the World Artistic Gymnastics Championships
Gymnasts at the 2016 Summer Olympics
Olympic gymnasts of Greece
Olympic medalists in gymnastics
Olympic gold medalists for Greece
Olympic bronze medalists for Greece
Medalists at the 2016 Summer Olympics
Mediterranean Games gold medalists for Greece
Competitors at the 2013 Mediterranean Games
Mediterranean Games medalists in gymnastics
Gymnasts at the 2020 Summer Olympics
Medalists at the 2020 Summer Olympics
Gymnasts from Athens